Dark Holler: Old Love Songs and Ballads is a 2005 compilation album released by Smithsonian Folkways. The album is composed of Appalachian folk music 1960's recordings made and compiled by musicologist  John Cohen in Madison County, North Carolina. Most of the songs are done in an a cappella style.

More than half of the songs on the album are sung by Dillard Chandler, a "mysterious" illiterate man who knew hundreds of songs.  Allmusic writes that Chandler sings with "deft precision, often with the song's strong sexual undercurrents intact".

The songs contain several dark topics and themes such as murder, revenge, infidelity, and abandoned children.  The New York Times describes the album as "traditional songs about love and murder usually traceable to England, a century or more before, but sung in a style rooted in the region: the singers all stretch out, irregularly, on vowels of their choosing, and add upturned yips to the end of stanzas".

Cas Wallin, who sings on two of the album's songs told North Carolinian author Sheila Kay Adams, "They’re studying this for a reason, Sheila, it’s because they don’t think it’s going to last much longer". Despite Wallin's fears, Cohen writes in his liner notes that traditional singing is still alive and well, and a source of pride in rural North Carolina. Allmusic comments, "Hope would appear to be in short supply in these songs, but there is a tenacity of spirit in these old ballads that implies hope in the future by refusing to forget the past."

A bonus DVD of the short documentary film The End of an Old Song is included with the CD packaging. The film features Chandler's hardscrabble lifestyle and is described as "stark and lonesome".  No Depression's Barry Mazor noted the film's desolate theme.

Track listing

Notes and references

External links
 Album page on Smithsonian Global Sound
 Madison County Project – A documentary on the tradition of unaccompanied ballad singing in Madison County

Old-time music
Works about Appalachia
Folk albums by American artists
Madison County, North Carolina
2005 compilation albums